DVieD-EP (pronounced "Divide EP") is an EP and the third release by Donnie Vie as a solo artist.

Track listing 
All original songs written by Donnie Vie
 "Code Red" - 5:02
 "Country Roads" (John Denver) - 3:55
 "If You Could Read My Mind" (Gordon Lightfoot) - 3:00
 "I Love the Way" - 3:25
 "Lucy in the Sky with Diamonds" (The Beatles) - 4:14
 "Somewhere" - 4:09

References 

2006 debut EPs
Power pop EPs
Donnie Vie albums